The 2022 Buzz Chew Chevrolet Cadillac 200 was a NASCAR Whelen Modified Tour race that was held on June 25, 2022 at the Riverhead Raceway. It was contested over 200 laps on the  oval. It was the 7th race of the 2022 NASCAR Whelen Modified Tour season. Kyle Soper collected his first Modified Tour victory with a late-race pass for the lead on Justin Bonsignore.

Report

Entry list 

 (R) denotes rookie driver.
 (i) denotes driver who is ineligible for series driver points.

Practice

Qualifying

Starting lineup

Race 

Laps: 200

Race statistics 

 Lead changes: 4
 Cautions/Laps: 4 for 35 laps
 Time of race: 0:54:36
 Average speed: 54.945

References 

2022 NASCAR Whelen Modified Tour
2022 in sports in New York (state)
Buzz Chew Chevrolet Cadillac 200